The Western Antarctic Ice Sheet (WAIS) is the segment of the continental ice sheet that covers West Antarctica, the portion of Antarctica on the side of the Transantarctic Mountains that lies in the Western Hemisphere. The WAIS is classified as a marine-based ice sheet, meaning that its bed lies well below sea level and its edges flow into floating ice shelves. The WAIS is bounded by the Ross Ice Shelf, the Ronne Ice Shelf, and outlet glaciers that drain into the Amundsen Sea.

Description

It is estimated that the volume of the Antarctic ice sheet is about 25.4 million km3 (6.1 million cu mi), and the WAIS contains just under 10% of this, or 2.2 million km3 (530,000 cu mi).

Under the force of its own weight, the ice sheet deforms and flows. The interior ice flows slowly over rough bedrock. In some circumstances, ice can flow faster in ice streams, separated by slow-flowing ice ridges. The inter-stream ridges are frozen to the bed while the bed beneath the ice streams consists of water-saturated sediments. Many of these sediments were deposited before the ice sheet occupied the region, when much of West Antarctica was covered by the ocean. The rapid ice-stream flow is a non-linear process still not fully understood; streams can start and stop for unclear reasons.

When ice reaches the coast, it either calves or continues to flow outward onto the water. The result is a large, floating ice shelf affixed to the continent.

Climate change

Warming and net ice loss
The West Antarctic ice sheet (WAIS) has warmed by more than /decade in the last fifty years, and the warming is the strongest in winter and spring. Although this is partly offset by fall cooling in East Antarctica, this effect was restricted to the 1980s and 1990s. The continent-wide average surface temperature trend of Antarctica is positive and statistically significant at >/decade since 1957. This warming of WAIS is strongest in the Antarctic Peninsula. Some scientists now fear that the WAIS could now collapse like the Larsen B Ice Shelf did in 2002.

Indications that the West Antarctic Ice Sheet is losing mass at an increasing rate come from the Amundsen Sea sector, and three glaciers in particular: Pine Island Glacier, Thwaites Glacier and Smith Glacier. Data reveals these three glaciers are losing more ice than is being replaced by snowfall. According to a preliminary analysis, the difference between the mass lost and mass replaced is about 60%. There is growing evidence that this trend is accelerating: there has been a 75% increase in Antarctic ice mass loss in the ten years 1996–2006, with glacier acceleration a primary cause. As of November 2012 the total mass loss from the West Antarctic Ice Sheet is estimated at  mainly from the Amundsen Sea coast.

The loss is especially pronounced at grounding lines, the area where the floating ice shelf meets the part resting on bedrock, and hence affects the ice shelf stability and flow rates.

Potential collapse

Large parts of the WAIS sit on a bed which is both below sea level and sloping downward inland. This slope, and the low isostatic head, mean that the ice sheet is theoretically unstable: a small retreat could in theory destabilize the entire WAIS, leading to rapid disintegration. Current computer models do not account well for the complicated and uncertain physics necessary to simulate this process, and observations do not provide guidance, so predictions as to its rate of retreat remain uncertain. This has been known for decades. It is considered one of the tipping points in the climate system.

In 2000s

The possible disastrous outcome of a disintegration of the WAIS for global sea levels has been mentioned and assessed in the IPCC Third Assessment Report from 2001. However, it was not included in the IPCC Fourth Assessment Report. Jessica O'Reilly, Naomi Oreskes and Michael Oppenheimer discussed the case in a Social Studies of Science paper 2012. According to them, IPCC authors were less certain about potential WAIS disintegration not only due to external new science results. As well pure internal "cultural" reasons, as changes of staff within the IPCC and externally, made it too difficult to project the range of possible futures for the WAIS as required. Mike Hulme saw the issue as a showcase to urge for the integration of minority views in the IPCC and other major assessment processes.

In January 2006, in a UK government-commissioned report, the head of the British Antarctic Survey, Chris Rapley, warned that this huge West Antarctic Ice Sheet may be starting to disintegrate. (If the entire West Antarctic Ice Sheet were to melt, this would contribute  to global sea level.) Rapley said a previous (2001) Intergovernmental Panel on Climate Change (IPCC) report that played down the worries of the ice sheet's stability should be revised. "I would say it is now an awakened giant. There is real concern."

Rapley said, "Parts of the Antarctic ice sheet that rest on bedrock below sea level have begun to discharge ice fast enough to make a significant contribution to sea level rise. Understanding the reason for this change is urgent in order to be able to predict how much ice may ultimately be discharged and over what timescale. Current computer models do not include the effect of liquid water on ice sheet sliding and flow, and so provide only conservative estimates of future behaviour."

Polar ice experts from the US and UK met at the University of Texas at Austin in March, 2007 for the West Antarctic Links to Sea-Level Estimation (WALSE) Workshop. The experts discussed a new hypothesis that explains the observed increased melting of the West Antarctic Ice Sheet. They proposed that changes in air circulation patterns have led to increased upwelling of warm, deep ocean water along the coast of Antarctica and that this warm water has increased melting of floating ice shelves at the edge of the ice sheet. An ocean model has shown how changes in winds can help channel the water along deep troughs on the sea floor, toward the ice shelves of outlet glaciers. The exact cause of the changes in circulation patterns is not known and they may be due to natural variability. However, this connection between the atmosphere and upwelling of deep ocean water provides a mechanism by which human induced climate changes could cause an accelerated loss of ice from the WAIS. Recently published data collected from satellites support this hypothesis, suggesting that the West Antarctic Ice Sheet is beginning to show signs of instability.

After 2010
On 12 May 2014, it was announced that two teams of scientists said the long-feared collapse of the Ice Sheet had begun, kicking off what they say will be a centuries-long, "unstoppable" process that could raise sea levels by  They estimate that rapid drawdown of Thwaites Glacier will begin in 200 – 1000 years. (Scientific source articles: Rignot et al. 2014  and Joughin et al. 2014.) More recent research suggests that a partial collapse of Thwaites Glacier could occur sooner, as the ice shelf that restricts the eastern third of the glacier's flow is now showing instability, as warming waters undermine the grounding zone, where the glacier connects to its floating ice shelf. According to Ted Scambos, a glaciologist at the University of Colorado Boulder and a leader of the International Thwaites Glacier Collaboration, in a 2021 interview from McMurdo Station, "Things are evolving really rapidly here. It's daunting."

Later in 2014, the IPCC Fifth Assessment Report discussed the possibility of the collapse of marine-based sectors of the Antarctic ice sheet. It expressed medium confidence that if such an event were to occur, it would not add more than several tenths of a metre to sea level rise during this period. In the absence of a collapse, it estimated that the gradual ice loss would most likely add around 6 cm to sea level rise under the Representative Concentration Pathway 2.6 (a scenario of strong climate change mitigation),  and 4 cm under RCP 8.5, a scenario where the greenhouse gas emissions continue to increase at a high rate for the rest of the century. The reason why a scenario of much greater warming sees a lower contribution to sea level rise is because the more intense effects of climate change on the water cycle result in an increased precipitation over the ice sheet, which would freeze on the surface, and this increase in the surface mass balance (SMB) would counteract a larger fraction of the ice loss. The uncertainty in the way different climate change models simulate both ice sheet dynamics and the water cycle means that for RCP 2.6 and RCP 8.5, the 5%-95% confidence interval ranges from a 4 cm decrease in sea levels to a 16 cm rise, and an 8 cm decrease to a 14 cm rise, respectively. 

In 2016, improved computer modeling revealed that the breakup of glaciers could lead to a steep rise in sea levels much more quickly than previously projected. "We're in danger of handing young people a situation that's out of their control," according to James E. Hansen, the leader of a number of climate scientists who worked together to compile the study. In 2018, scientists concluded that high sea levels some 125,000 years ago, which were 6–9 m (20–30 ft) higher than today, were most likely due to the absence of the WAIS, and found evidence that the ice sheet collapsed under climate conditions similar to those of today.

In 2021, these modeling improvements were represented in the IPCC Sixth Assessment Report, where the end-of-century Antarctic sea ice loss is much more aggressive, and contribution from ice sheet collapse processes is now included in the 5-95% range. It now estimates that under the SSP1-2.6, which corresponds to the Fifth Report's RCP 2.6 and includes aggressive mitigation and is largely in accordance with the goals of the Paris Agreement, the median sea level rise contribution from the Antarctica is around 11 cm, with a likely (17-85%) range of 3 to 27 cm, and only the very likely (5-95%) range includes the chance of an 1 cm reduction to sea level rise, which is as likely as a 41 cm increase in sea levels due to ice sheet collapse going well underway. Under the "moderate" SSP2-4.5 scenario, the figures are very similar, as winter precipitation over the ice sheet rises in tandem with increased ice loss from the atmospheric and ocean warming: the median estimate is also 11 cm, with a likely range of 3 to 29 cm, and the very likely range of -1 to 46 cm. However, increases in precipitation can no longer keep up with or outpace the increased ice sheet breakdown if the emissions increase indefinitely under SSP5-8.5: its median contribution is 12 cm, with a likely range of 3 to 34 cm, and the very likely range of 0 to 57 cm. It had also cited the limited-confidence (based on just three studies) predictions of the earlier IPCC SROCC about sea level rise by the year 2300: it suggested that sea level rise contribution would not go much further beyond the 2100 levels under the 2.6 scenario (16 cm median, 37 cm maximum), but would accelerate to a median of 1.46 metres (with a minimum and a maximum of 60 cm and 2.89 metres) under the 8.5 scenario. Likewise, it had acknowledged the possibility of a West Antarctic ice sheet tipping point around 1.5°C, but noted that it was much less likely at that level than at 2°C, while it would become practically certain around 3°C. 

In 2022, an extensive assessment of tipping points in the climate system was published in the Science Magazine. For the West Antarctic Ice Sheet, the paper concluded that it would most likely be committed to long-term disintegration around 1.5°C of global warming, but the threshold could be between 1°C (in which case it is already set in motion, and may only be stopped if the warming is reversed, or perhaps even reduced to levels below the preindustrial) and 3°C. It suggested that once the threshold is crossed, the collapse of the entire ice sheet would most likely take place over 2000 years, although the overall certainty is limited, and it could take as long as 13,000 years, or as little as 500 years. It had also factored in the contribution of ice-albedo feedback after a total loss of the ice sheet: global temperatures would be increased by 0.05°C, while the local temperatures would increase by around 1°C.

West Antarctic Rift System 

The West Antarctic Rift System (WARS)  is one of the major active continental rifts on Earth.
In 2017, geologists from Edinburgh University discovered 91 volcanoes located two kilometres below the icy surface, making it the largest volcanic region on Earth.
The WARS is believed to have a major influence on ice flows in West Antarctica. In western Marie Byrd Land active glaciers flow through fault-bounded valleys (grabens) of the WARS. Sub-ice volcanism has been detected and proposed to influence ice flow. Fast-moving ice streams in the Siple Coast adjacent to the east edge of the Ross Ice Shelf are influenced by the lubrication provided by water-saturated till within fault-bounded grabens within the rift, which would act to accelerate ice-sheet disintegration at more intense levels of climate change.

See also
 East Antarctic Ice Sheet
 List of glaciers in the Antarctic
 Retreat of glaciers since 1850
 WAIS Divide Ice Core Drilling Project

Notes

References

External links
 WAIS – West Antarctic Ice Sheet Initiative – A multidisciplinary study of rapid climate change and future sea level. Sponsored by National Science Foundation Office of Polar Programs and NASA Earth Science.
 U.S. National Snow and Ice Data Center Antarctic Data
 Crystal Ball: Scientists Race to Foretell West Antarctica's Unclear Future
 "Structure Found Deep Within West Antarctic Ice Sheet", ScienceDaily, September 2004

2014 in Antarctica
Articles containing video clips
Ice sheets of Antarctica